Camp Siegfried, a summer camp which taught Nazi ideology, was located in Yaphank, New York, on Long Island. It was owned by the German American Bund, an American Nazi organization devoted to promoting a favorable view of Nazi Germany, and was operated by the German American Settlement League (GASL). Camp Siegfried was one of many such camps in the US in the 1930s, including Camp Hindenberg in Grafton, Wisconsin, Camp Nordland in Andover, New Jersey, Deutschhorst Country Club in Sellersville, Pennsylvania, and a camp in Windham, New York.

Description and history
Camp Siegfried had a pool, archery competitions, hikes through the woods, a youth camp on the other side of Upper Lake, oom-pah bands and Oktoberfest celebrations; women in German peasant outfits greeted visitors at the gate. Weekend-morning Long Island Railroad trains called "Camp Siegfried Specials" ran from Penn Station in New York City to Yaphank for the convenience of the camp's guests, many of whom came out from the German-American Manhattan neighborhood of Yorkville to spend time at what appeared to be a family-oriented summer retreat. In 1938, The New York Times reported that 40,000 people attended that year's annual German Day festivities.

But Camp Siegfried also had Nazi and Hitler Youth flags displayed on the grounds, along with pictures of Adolf Hitler, and men were photographed there in Italian Fascist-style blackshirts, SA-style brownshirts, and Nazi military uniforms. According to a court case brought against the German American Settlement League in 1938 for failing to register with New York's Secretary of State – a violation of the Civil Rights Law of 1923, which was enacted to control the Ku Klux Klan – to become a member of the League one had to swear allegiance to Hitler and to the leaders of the German American Bund; the court found against the League. During the trial, a witness was asked to demonstrate how those at the camp saluted the American flag. Initially resistant, he responded by giving the Nazi salute. When asked if this was "the American salute", the witness responded "It will be."

According to The Washington Post, the purpose of Camp Siegfried was to "[r]aise the future leaders of America – and make sure they were steeped in Nazi ideals." These future Aryan leaders were not only forced to physically build the camp's infrastructure – so as to avoid hiring union labor, when the unions were, the camp's leaders thought, full of Jews – but were also coerced into having sex with each other in order to breed a new generation of perfect Aryan children.

The German American Bund severed its connection with the German American Settlement League in 1940, and the League took over the Camp with the announcement that henceforth it would be "non-political." 

Camp Siegfried was transformed into "German Gardens", a planned community which had been approved by the Town of Brookhaven in 1936. Located along Upper Lake, part of German Gardens – where streets named after Hitler, Joseph Goebbels and Hermann Göring were not changed until 1941 – was later absorbed by Yaphank, while the remainder became Siegfried Park, a 40-acre private community of small bungalows and suburban-type ranch houses with well-kept lawns, where the land under the houses was owned by the German American Settlement League, and no one could buy a house without being approved by the League. Technically a co-op, the League's by-laws included a restrictive covenant that all home-buyers had to be mostly "of German extraction." This was struck down by a federal judge in 2016 as the result of a lawsuit, and the community's bylaws were rewritten to require it to comply with all fair housing laws, at the federal, state and local levels, but the discriminatory practices continued despite this, with the League making it difficult for homeowners to sell. In May 2017, New York state prosecutors announced that they had reached a settlement with the League to end any discriminatory housing policies and practices. According to the state's Attorney General, Eric Schneiderman, the agreement "will once and for all put an end to the GASL's discrimination."

In popular culture
Camp Siegfried, an off-Broadway play based on the historical camp, premiered in 2021. It is set in 1938 and follows the relationship of two American teenagers at the camp.

See also
Camp Nordland
Nazism in the United States

References

External links
Yaphank History (Longwood Public Library)

20th-century disestablishments in New York (state)
1930s establishments in New York (state)
Brookhaven, New York
Buildings and structures in Suffolk County, New York
Defunct organizations based in New York (state)
Defunct summer camps
German American Bund
 German-American culture in New York (state)
Organizations established in the 1930s
Sieg